In molecular biology, Z248 is a member of the C/D class of snoRNA which contain the C (UGAUGA) and  D (CUGA) box motifs. Most of the members of the box C/D family function in directing site-specific 2'-O-methylation of substrate RNAs.

References

External links 
 

Small nuclear RNA